Karl Sievers may refer to:

Karl Sievers (naval officer), a German admiral during World War I
Karl Sievers (army officer), a German general during World War II
Karl-Heinz Sievers, a German Olympic athlete